The 1988–89 All-Ireland Senior Club Hurling Championship was the 19th staging of the All-Ireland Senior Club Hurling Championship, the Gaelic Athletic Association's premier inter-county club hurling tournament. The championship began on 25 September 1988 and ended on 17 March 1989.

Midleton were the defending champions, however, they failed to qualify after losing in the Cork Senior Hurling Championship.

On 17 March 1989, Buffer's Alley won the championship following a 2-12 to 0-12 defeat of O'Donovan Rossa in the All-Ireland final. This was their first All-Ireland title.

Results

Connacht Senior Club Hurling Championship

First round

Second round

Semi-final

Final

Leinster Senior Club Hurling Championship

First round

Quarter-finals

Semi-finals

Final

Munster Senior Club Hurling Championship

Quarter-finals

Semi-finals

Final

Ulster Senior Club Hurling Championship

Semi-finals

Final

All-Ireland Senior Club Hurling Championship

Quarter-final

Semi-finals

Final

Championship statistics

Top scorers

Top scorers overall

Top scorers in a single game

References

1988 in hurling
1989 in hurling
All-Ireland Senior Club Hurling Championship